Tasos Nousias (born 12 August 1973) is a Greek actor. He has appeared in more than thirty films since 1996.

Selected filmography

References

External links 

1973 births
Living people
Greek male film actors
People from Ioannina (regional unit)